Satan Takes A Holiday is a Stockholm-based band, created in 2006 by Fred Burman, Johannes Lindsjöö and Svante Nordström.

The band released the self-titled debut album in late 2009. A few months later they were nominated in the Best Rock category at the Swedish P3 Guld Awards, and the songs “Missy” and “Heartbreaker” were played regularly on the radio.

The second album Who Do You Voodoo was released March 2012, preceded by the single "Karma Babe".

In June 2013 they opened for Kiss together with Hardcore Superstar at Friends Arena in Stockholm.

In spring 2014, they released the double A-sided single - "Talk of The Town" / "This Microphone", followed by the third full-length album "Animal Man Woman" in November 2014.

Swedish Despotz Records signed a record deal with Satan Takes A Holiday in 2016. The label released the singles "The Beat" and "Ladder To Climb", which both come from "Aliens", the band's fourth full-length album, released on February 24, 2016.

With their mix of rock and roll, sixties’ garage and punk rock, Satan Takes A Holiday have received many positive reviews both for their recorded music, and for their live performances.

Members
Fred Burman – guitar, lead vocals
Johannes Lindsjöö – bass guitar, vocals
Danne McKenzie - drums, backing vocals

Past members
Svante Nordström – drums, vocals

Discography

Albums
 Satan Takes A Holiday (2009)
 Who Do You Voodoo (2012)
 Animal Man Woman (2014)
 Aliens (2017)
 A New Sensation (2019)

Singles
 Come Over (I Make You Look Good) (2007)
 Karma Babe (2012)
 Who Do You Voodoo (2012)
 Radio (2013)
 This Microphone/Talk of The Town (2014)
 Zombie Hands (2014)
 Pony High (2015)
 The Beat (2016)
 Ladder To Climb (2017)
 Love Me Like I Love Me (2017)

Compilations
 Tyst För Fan – Ekon Från Ebba Grön (2013) where Satan Takes A Holiday appears with the Ebba Grön cover "Häng Gud"

References

External links 
 The Official Site of Satan Takes A Holiday

Musical groups established in 2006
Musical groups from Stockholm